Xun Yu (163–212), courtesy name Wenruo, was a Chinese military official and politician who served as an adviser to the warlord Cao Cao during the late Eastern Han dynasty of China.

Early life
Xun Yu was from Yingchuan Commandery (around present-day Xuchang, Henan), and was born in a family of government officials. He was described in historical records as a tall and handsome gentleman. His grandfather, Xun Shu, served as a local governor and had eight sons who were nicknamed the "Eight Dragons of the Xun Family"; an uncle of Xun Yu, Xun Shuang, served as one of the Three Ducal Ministers, while Xun Yu's father Xun Fan was the chancellor of the principality of Jibei.

Xun Yu proved to be a talented youth, and was evaluated by the scholar He Yong as "someone capable of assisting kings". In 189, he was nominated as a xiaolian (civil service candidate) and began his career in the civil service. When the warlord Dong Zhuo seized control of the capital Luoyang, Xun Yu feared for his safety and resigned, returning to Ji Province (present day Hebei).

In the subsequent years, warlords quickly rose in each region; Xun Yu first served Yuan Shao, whose power base was in Ji Province, but later left him and went to serve Cao Cao in 191. Cao Cao recognised Xun Yu's talent and he exclaimed, "Here comes my Zifang!" when Xun Yu arrived, and he appointed Xun as an army commandant.

Service under Cao Cao
Xun Yu's contributions to Cao Cao's forces and administration are immense. On one hand he recommended many other men of calibre to Cao Cao, including Xun You (his second cousin-nephew), Chen Qun, Zhong Yao, Guo Jia and Sima Yi, creating a body of advisors around Cao; at the same time he participated in several battles and major events of the era, often giving timely advice to his lord. Cao Cao, in turn, respected Xun Yu greatly and placed great store in his advice.

In 194, as Cao Cao led a campaign against Tao Qian in Xu Province, his home base at Yan Province was suddenly attacked by Lü Bu, and two of Cao's officials, Chen Gong and Zhang Miao, chose to defect to Lü Bu. At that time Xun Yu was in charge of the defences of Juancheng, and his firm actions saved the city from capture, allowing Cao Cao's armies to return and drive away Lü Bu. Subsequently, on the death of Tao Qian, Cao Cao was tempted to turn around and move on Xu Province before returning to deal with Lü Bu; it was Xun Yu who dissuaded him from this, reminding him that Yan Province was his heartland and power base and should be secured first before launching campaigns abroad.

It was also at Xun Yu's suggestion that Cao Cao chose to escort Emperor Xian, who was then living in the ruins of Luoyang, to his own base at Xu (present-day Xuchang, Henan) in 196, taking on the role of protecting the emperor. Xun Yu's plan was to "control the insubordinate in the name of the emperor"; the 14th-century historical novel Romance of the Three Kingdoms subtly distorts this to "hold the emperor hostage to control the nobles". In the long run, this strategy would give Cao Cao a considerable political advantage over his rivals, allowing him to legitimise his actions by taking them in the name of the emperor.

In 200, Cao Cao was locked in a stalemate against Yuan Shao at the Battle of Guandu for months, eventually exhausting his food supply; while contemplating retreat he sent a letter to Xun Yu (who was then defending Xu) for advice. Xun Yu dissuaded Cao Cao with a letter, highlighting several advantages that his army held over Yuan Shao's forces and urging him to stand fast; the eventual result was a decisive victory for Cao Cao, which was crucial to his domination of northern China.

Death
In 211, Dong Zhao and a group of Cao Cao loyalists submitted a memorial to Emperor Xian proposing that Cao should be granted the title of a duke. This proposal was significant as it would allow Cao Cao to set up a self-contained feudal state within the Han dynasty. Up to this point, Cao Cao's political legitimacy was only underpinned by his position as the chancellor. Xun Yu, whose ideals were for Cao Cao to continue being the protector of the Han dynasty, opposed Dong Zhao's proposal.

Knowing that Dong Zhao was probably a conduit for Cao Cao, when approached by the former for his support, Xun Yu told Dong that Cao's personal mission was one of restoring the Han dynasty and would not approve of such a move – thus possibly hinting to Cao that he should abandon the idea. Xun Yu's remarks greatly displeased Cao Cao.

Following this, Xun Yu was sent to Qiao to reward the soldiers who took part in a military campaign against Sun Quan. While there, Xun Yu was said to have fallen sick and brought to Shouchun (寿春; present-day Shou County, Anhui) for treatment and recuperation. He died in the following year in 212. The circumstances of his death aroused great suspicion and is a matter of debate as it came closely after his opposition towards Cao Cao's ascension to duke.

Family
Grandfather: Xun Shu, served as Prefect of Langling
Father: Xun Gun, served as Chancellor of Jinan
Uncles:
Xun Jian
Xun Jing
Xun Dao
Xun Wang
Xun Shuang, served as Chancellor of Pingyuan, Minister of the Household, and Excellency of Works
Xun Su
Xun Fu
Siblings:
Xun Yan, third brother
Xun Chen, fourth brother, served Yuan Shao, persuaded Han Fu to surrender, fate unknown after the Battle of Guandu
Spouse: Lady Tang, daughter of Tang Heng
Sons:
Xun Yun, served as Rapid as Tigers General of the Household, married Cao Cao's daughter Princess Anyang, died at a young age
Xun Yu, served as Palace Assistant Imperial Clerk
Xun Shen, served as General-in-Chief's Assistant Officer, died at a young age
Xun Yi, rose to the position of Grand Commandant during the Jin dynasty, posthumously honoured as Duke Kang of Linhuai
Xun Can, a scholar and xuanxue philosopher, married Cao Hong's daughter
Son-in-law: Chen Qun, served the state of Wei, initiator of the nine-rank system
Second cousin-nephew: Xun You, one of Cao Cao's advisors
Grandsons:
Xun Han, oldest son of Xun Yun, granted title of Marquis of Guangyangxiang, died at the age of 30
Xun Yi, second son of Xun Yun, married Sima Yi's daughter Princess Nanyang, served as a general, posthumously granted title of Marquis of Zhen
Xun Yu, son of Xun Yu, served as Imperial Secretary during the Jin Dynasty
 Chen Tai, son of Chen Qun, participated in counterattackst Jiang Wei's campaigns
Great-grandsons:
Xun Jun, son of Xun Han, served as Right Inspector of the Feathered Forest Imperial Guard, died at a young age
Xun Dan, oldest son of Xun Yi, served as Minister Steward
Xun Kai, second son of Xun Yi, served as General Who Conquers the West during the Jin Dynasty
Xun Kui, third son of Xun Yi, served as Protector General of the Army, posthumously appointed General of Chariots and Cavalry
Xun Yu, son of Xun Yu, served as Imperial Secretary
Descendants:
Xun Song, son of Xun Jun, served as a Household Counsellor
Xun Guan, daughter of Xun Song
Xun Xian, son of Xun Song, served as North General of the Household, and Governor of Xu and Yan provinces
Xun Bozi, grandson of Xun Xian, served as a Palace Assistant Imperial Clerk during the Liu Song dynasty, author of the Xun Family Records

In popular culture

In Koei's video game Dynasty Warriors 7: Empires, fans voted in the Facebook and Twitter poll for one of the new officers to have the name Xun Yu. Xun Yu became a playable character in Koei's Dynasty Warriors 8: Empires.

In Koei's Kessen II, Xun Yu plays a prominent role, although the character is portrayed as a woman who harbours a requited love for Cao Cao. In the visual novel and anime series Koihime Musō, Jun'iku (Xun Yu's Japanese name) also serves as a strategist to Sōsō (Cao Cao) and has a huge crush on her.

See also
 Lists of people of the Three Kingdoms

References

Citations

Bibliography
 Chen, Shou (3rd century). Records of the Three Kingdoms (Sanguozhi), Volume 10.
 Pei, Songzhi (5th century). Annotations to Records of the Three Kingdoms (Sanguozhi zhu).

163 births
212 deaths
2nd-century Chinese people
3rd-century Chinese people
Han dynasty politicians from Henan
Officials under Cao Cao
Officials under Yuan Shao
Politicians from Xuchang